The Kingdom, Op. 51, is an English-language oratorio composed in 1906 by Edward Elgar. It was first performed at the Birmingham Music Festival on 3 October 1906, with the orchestra conducted by the composer, and soloists Agnes Nicholls, Muriel Foster, John Coates and William Higley.  The dedication is "A. M. D. G." Elgar wrote The Kingdom for choral and instrumental forces.

Overview
Following The Dream of Gerontius and The Apostles, the Birmingham Triennial Music Festival commissioned Elgar to produce another large oratorio for the 1906 festival. This was The Kingdom, which continues the narrative of the lives of Jesus's disciples. It depicts the community of the early church, Pentecost, and the events of the next few days.

Elgar had been planning a work depicting the Apostles as ordinary men, reacting to extraordinary events, for many years. His ideas outgrew the confines of a single work: parts of The Kingdom were written before The Apostles, and later Elgar considered them as the first two parts of a trilogy. The Kingdom is, in effect, its slow movement. In the event, the projected third part was never written.

Performers
The Kingdom is written for a large orchestra, of typical late Romantic proportions. There is a double chorus with semichorus, and four soloists representing: The Blessed Virgin (soprano), Mary Magdalene (contralto), St John (tenor), and St Peter (bass).

Synopsis
The work is in five parts, and is preceded by a prelude. Each part is played without a break. Words were selected by Elgar from the Acts of the Apostles, supplemented by material mainly from the Gospels.
 In the Upper Room. The disciples meet and the new Apostle, Matthias, is chosen.
 At the Beautiful Gate. The two Marys remember Jesus's actions in the temple.
 Pentecost. The disciples are visited by the Holy Spirit and preach to the multitudes.
 The Sign of Healing. Peter and John heal the lame man and are imprisoned.
 The Upper Room. Peter and John have been released; the disciples break bread and sing the Lord's Prayer.
As in Elgar's other mature oratorios, the Prelude introduces the main musical themes and sets the mood. The music is lyrical and mystical, with less narrative drive than in The Apostles. Its most memorable moments are the ecstatic depiction of Pentecost, Mary's glowing aria The sun goeth down, and the devotional setting of the Lord's Prayer.

Novello's published a book of the words, with analytical and descriptive notes by Elgar's friend August Jaeger.

History
As has been said, the ideas of the unfinished trilogy had been on Elgar's mind for many years. Definite musical sketches date from 1902, and parts were completed before The Apostles. Composition began in earnest in early 1906, and proceeded with speed and confidence.

The first performance, conducted by Elgar, was a success, as was the first London performance the following November. The German translation was done by Julius Buths.

The work continues to be sung by talented choral societies, particularly in England, although less frequently than The Dream of Gerontius. Some of Elgar's more percipient supporters, including Adrian Boult, consider it his greatest choral work, of more consistent quality than even Gerontius.

As Elgar was an amateur chemist, the original manuscript of the work is stained with chemicals from his home laboratory.

Notes

References
Much of the information in this article can be found in:

External links 
 The Kingdom (1901–06)
 The Kingdom: Synopsis
 
 The Kingdom on site from Elgar Society
 

Oratorios
Compositions by Edward Elgar
1906 compositions
Music with dedications